My Ghost Story is an American television series on the paranormal, which premiered on July 17, 2010, on the Biography Channel. The series features ghost stories told from a person's own supposed experience with the supernatural. Each episode features claims of encounters at reportedly haunted locations all over the United States, as well as a few locations in other countries. A spin-off series My Ghost Story Asia premiered on the Biography Channel (Asia) on 16 August 2012 featuring stories from Singapore and Malaysia. The fifth season started on October 5, 2012, on Fridays at 9/8 Central.
The sixth season which began on August 12, 2013, aired on the Biography Channel, the original broadcast channel, but halfway through the season the broadcast channel was changed to the Lifetime Movie Network (LMN).

Synopsis
Each episode is narrated by people who tell their own unique ghost stories and personal experiences of alleged paranormal activity and supposed encounters with the unexplained in a particular location. These individuals usually start off the show by saying "My ghost story began when..." They also show the viewers' visual evidence they claim to have captured on their homemade videos.

Each episode features reenactments, video clips, and interviews of people who claim to have experienced encounters with the supernatural. These stories also include some historical facts of the reportedly haunted locations.

Syndication
Note: The My Ghost Story series is based on the 2008 and 2009 specials My Ghost Story: Hauntings Revealed. New episodes formerly aired on the Biography Channel Saturday nights at 10pm EST. Season two premiered on April 9, 2011. Season three premiered on October 15, 2011. Season four premiered on April 21, 2012. My Ghost Story formerly aired on Lifetime/Lifetime Movie Network. As of 2019, My Ghost Story is currently airing rewreruns on FYI and on Travel Channel.

Warning: At the beginning of each episode a parental advisory warning is shown: "What you are about to see are haunted events encountered by real people. Some may find it disturbing."

Series overview

Specials

Episodes

Season 1 (2010)

Season 2 (2011)
{| class="wikitable" style="width:100%;" style=background:#FFFFFF;"
|-
! style="background:purple;"|Ep. #
! style="background:purple;"|Episode Title
! style="background:purple;"|Original Airdate
|-
! 2.1 !! An Entity In Bed !!  
|-
! Locations
|colspan="3"|
"Creepy Sleep" - (private residence), Pasadena, Maryland
"A Piercing Experience" - Tillie Pierce House Bed & Breakfast, (Maltilda's Mercantile) Gettysburg, Pennsylvania
"The Phantasmagorical Castle" - Nemacolin Castle, Brownsville, Pennsylvania
"Eternal Love Affair" - Myrtles Plantation, St. Francisville, Louisiana
"Hair-Raising Hospital of Horror" - Linda Vista Community Hospital, Los Angeles, California
"A Ghostly House Guest" - (private residence), Hattiesburg, Mississippi
|-
! Overview
|colspan="3"|
In the season opener: A woman feels the presence of a ghost in her own bed; the ghosts of two sisters haunts a Civil War-era house; a castle built on a Native American burial ground is haunted by the spirits of Indians; visitors capture an image of a murderous ghost; encounters at a bed and breakfast are reported by guests staying there; and a haunted abandoned hospital of horrors is experienced by a musician.
|-
| colspan="3" style="background:purple;"|
|-
! 2.2 !! A Haunted House !!    
|-
!Locations
|colspan="3"|
 "Haunted Attraction" - Black Moon Manor (haunted house attraction), Greenfield, Indiana
 "Destination Eternity" - Allegheny Airlines Flight 853 (crash site), Fairland, Indiana
 "Anger At Iron Island" - Iron Island Museum, Buffalo, New York
 "Spooky Speakeasy" - Gas Light Inn, Indianapolis, Indiana
 "Secretary Scare" - Victorian house (real estate offices) (former funeral home), New Lenox, Illinois
 "Ghost Boy and His Dog" - Andrew Woods House, Gettysburg, Pennsylvania
|-
!Overview
|colspan="3"|
A couple unknowingly buys a haunted house; a haunting of a bar in Indiana is captured on video; an EVP of a ghostly voice of a passenger that was killed in a plane crash is heard on a digital recorder; a dog meets a ghost boy; and a terrified secretary runs from her own office building that seems to be haunted.
|-
| colspan="3" style="background:purple;"| 
|-
! 2.3 !! The Demon In The Mist !!    
|-
!Locations
|colspan="3"|
 "The Smoking Ghost" - St. Augustine Lighthouse, Saint Augustine, Florida
 "Phantom Security Breach" - Anderson Municipal Business Center, Anderson, South Carolina
 "Ghost in the Water" - (private residence), Irvine, California
 "Bad Manored Demon" - (private residence), Manor, Texas
 "Restless Restroom" - Hurricane Patty's Restaurant & Bar at Oyster Creek Marina, Saint Augustine, Florida
 "House of 1,000 Spirits" - Victorian house (private residence), Hastings, Minnesota
|-
!Overview
|colspan="3"|
A ghost breaches security at a government building; a pipe-smoking spirit haunts a lighthouse; a son killed in a car accident makes his presence known to his grieving mother; a demon attacks guests a house by leaving scratch marks on their bodies; diners encounter a strange force in a restaurant bathroom strong to make grown men cry; and a woman captures haunting photos and video of the ghosts in her own home.
|-
| colspan="3" style="background:purple;"| 
|-
! 2.4 !! The Hand of Death !!    
|-
!Locations
|colspan="3"|
 "Tale of a Crypt" - Evergreen Cemetery, Colorado Springs, Colorado
 "Slaughter in the Basement" - Haunted Farmhouse (private residence), Fort Scott, Kansas
 "Haunted Horse Farm" - Horse Farm (private residence), Salvisa, Kentucky
 "Prosperous Spirits" - Prosperity School Bed & Breakfast, Joplin, Missouri
 "Light Fright" - (private residence), Ocala, Florida
 "Christmas Light Anomaly" - Early 19th-century house (private residence), St. Clairsville, Pennsylvania
|-
!Overview
|colspan="3"|
A cemetery that's home to 80,000 dead souls becomes a "ghost magnet"; a family discovers that their new home is filled with strange sounds and whispered conversations; a woman comes face-to-face with a ghost at her farm and tries to capture her new ghostly friend on video; the spirits of children happily haunts an inn by playing pranks and giggling; and angry entities force a couple out of their home.
|-
| colspan="3" style="background:purple;"| 
|-
! 2.5 !! The Dark Spirit !!    
|-
!Locations
|colspan="3"|
 "A Family's Inferno" - Palmyra Historical Museum, Palmyra, New York
 "Beware of Wolfe Manor" - Wolfe Manor, Clovis, California
 "The Mist Train" - Short Line Railroad Enginehouse, Gettysburg, Pennsylvania
 "Phantom of the Opera House" - Rohs Opera House, Cynthiana, Kentucky
 "A Housewarming Surprise" - (private residence), Surprise, Arizona
 "Hangman Haunting" - Jean Bonnet Tavern, Bedford, Pennsylvania
|-
!Overview
|colspan="3"|
The ghostly antics of two young boys killed at Christmas time in 1964 is captured on video; the tortured souls of a sanitarium haunt a house; chilling photos and recordings document intense paranormal activity at a railroad near the site of the Battle of Gettysburg; a real "Phantom of the Opera" at an old opera house; and the ghost of a woman peers forever out a window in hopes that she will see her lover return for her.
|-
| colspan="3" style="background:purple;"| 
|-
! 2.6 !! Life After Death !!    
|-
!Locations
|colspan="3"|
 "Til Death Do Us Part" - (private residence), Boynton Beach, Florida
 "A Family Drawn Together" - (private residence), Reno, Nevada
 "Bloodcurdling Birdcage" - Birdcage Theater, Tombstone, Arizona
 "Smiling Ghost" - Huguenot Cemetery, St. Augustine, Florida
 "The Hauntings of Buggs Temple" - Creation Cafe and Euphoria Restaurant at Buggs Temple, Indianapolis, Indiana
 "Spirited Bar Brawl" - Katie's Bar, Long Island, Smithtown, New York
|-
!Overview
|colspan="3"|
A tourist who was knifed in the back by a violent ghost while on vacation; a dead wife jealousy haunts her husband and his new girlfriend; a woman snaps the picture of a smiling apparition; and a ghost named "Charlie" messes with the minds of employees at a bar.
|-
| colspan="3" style="background:purple;"| 
|-
! 2.7 !! I Am Full of Madness !!    
|-
!Locations
|colspan="3"|
 "Mirror, Mirror on the Chifferobe" - (private residence), Martinsville, Indiana
 "Suicide Mansion" - Lemp Mansion, St. Louis, Missouri
 "No Demons Allowed" - Snow Hill Country Club, New Vienna, Ohio
 "The Grim Rapper" - (private residence), Norwich, Connecticut
 "Supernatural Settlement" - Oregon Country Settlement, Rhododendron, Oregon
 "Active Octagon" - Civil War Museum at Octagon Hall, Franklin, Kentucky
|-
!Overview
|colspan="3"|
A family heirloom, an old chifferobe brings with it spiritual baggage and light orbs were captured; Shadowy figures was captured in a mansion where several people has committed suicide; The chandelier of a country club was caught on video swinging on its own and EVPs and orbs were captured; ghosts chase a man from his own home and a ghostly demonic figure was captured; Frightening spirits appear at a former Native American gravesite and a ghost cat were captured; the ghost of a little girl Elizabeth was spotted and her EVP was captured. 
|-
| colspan="3" style="background:purple;"| 
|-
! 2.8 !! The Presence !!    
|-
!Locations
|colspan="3"|
 "Attack of the Bomb Factory" - Gulf Ordnance Factory, Prairie, Mississippi
 "Mid Evil Castle" - Preston School of Industry ( Preston Castle), Ione, California
 "Screams From The Cellar" - The Cellar Restaurant at Villa del Sol (former The Hotel California), Fullerton, California
 "Kodi The Friendly Ghost" - Mount Calvary Cemetery, Mosquero, New Mexico
 "Hexed From Beyond" - Tilley Bend Cemetery, Blue Ridge, Georgia
 "School's Out Forever" - Farrar Schoolhouse, Farrar, Iowa
|-
!Overview
|colspan="3"|
The curse of the witches in a cemetery, an old schoolhouse is haunted by the spirits of its former teachers and students; a man contemplating suicide is helped by a supernatural force; a strange ghost light is seen; and two women communicate with ghosts in a haunted castle.      
|-
| colspan="3" style="background:purple;"| 
|-
! 2.9 !! Simon Says Die !!    
|-
!Locations
|colspan="3"|
 "Possession At The Palmer" - The Palmer House Hotel, Sauk Centre, Minnesota
 "I.C.U. Ghosts" - Old South Pittsburg Hospital, South Pittsburg, Tennessee
 "Simon Says Die" - The Bissman Building, Mansfield, Ohio
 "Unluck Of The Irish" - Kells Irish Restaurant and Bar, Seattle, Washington
 "Uneasy Underground" - Shanghai Tunnels, Portland, Oregon
 "Phantom Farewell" - (private residence), Laguna Niguel, California
|-
!Overview
|colspan="3"|  
A terrifying seven-foot-tall shadow figure named "Mr. Black" haunts an abandoned hospital; a hotel is haunted by the spirit of a man whose head was severed by the freight elevator; a disfigured demon keeps terrorizes patrons at an Irish pub; tour guides reveal amazing photos of apparitions in a tunnel where many violent acts were committed; and a woman hears audio recordings of her dead parents. 
|-
| colspan="3" style="background:purple;"|
|-
! 2.10 !! Things That Go Bump In The Night !!    
|-
!Locations
|colspan="3"|
 "Black Mass" - Trichome Health Consultanta (wellness-center office), Colorado Springs, Colorado
 "Bishop of Brownella" - Brownella Cottage, Galion, Ohio
 "Disturbance in the Jailhouse" - Freestone County Museum/Barbara & H. Neil Bass Wing (19th century jail), Fairfield, Texas
 "Bedlam in Bellville" - (private residence), Bellville, Ohio
 "Bumps in the Night" - Crescent Hotel, Eureka Springs, Arkansas
 "Scratches in the Night" - 17 Hundred 90 Inn & Restaurant, Savannah, Georgia
|-
!Overview
|colspan="3"|      
A woman smell cigar smokes and felt a presence touching her, and a black entity was recorded; a psychology PHD captured EVPs and photos from a home haunted by a Catholic bishop; light orbs, EVPs, photos and video of a light switch being manipulated are captured at a museum; video of light orbs, EVPs and photos are captured in a couple's dream home where a husband had murdered his wife; a family took a vacation in a haunted hotel and captured light orbs and a white figure, and paranormal encounters; and a haunting at Georgia inn where the spirit of a woman is seen roaming the halls.
|-
| colspan="3" style="background:purple;"|
|}

Season 3 (2011)

Season 4 (2012)
Note: This season is subtitled My Ghost Story: Caught on Camera. 

Season 5 (2012-2013)Note: This season is also subtitled My Ghost Story: Caught on Camera. 

Season 6 (2013)Note: This season is also subtitled My Ghost Story: Caught on Camera'''. 

See also
 Ghost hunting
 List of ghost films
 List of reportedly haunted locations
 Paranormal television

Similar TV programsA HauntingCelebrity Ghost StoriesGhost AdventuresGhost HuntersGhost Hunters InternationalGhost LabGhost Stories (2009 TV series)Haunted HistoryMost HauntedMost Terrifying Places in AmericaParanormal State''

References

External links
 at Biography Channel

A&E (TV network) original programming
Paranormal television
English-language television shows